The Xihui Formation   is located in Ganxian County. Jiangxi Province and has been dated to the Neoarchean period.

References

Geology of Jiangxi
Geologic formations of China